Youwarou (or Youvarou) is a village and commune and seat of the Cercle of Youwarou in the Mopti Region of Mali. In 2009 the commune had a population of 23,046.

The market that is held in the village on Fridays serves many settlements in the surrounding region.

References

External links
.

Communes of Mopti Region